Rastupey Rural District is a rural district (dehestan) in the Central District of Savadkuh County, Mazandaran Province, Iran. At the 2006 census, its population was 7,084, in 2,022 families. The rural district has 63 villages.

References 

Rural Districts of Mazandaran Province
Savadkuh County